Montana is an unincorporated community in Johnson County, in the U.S. state of Arkansas.

History
A post office called Montana was established in 1881 and remained in operation until 1954. The community was named after the Montana Territory.

References

Unincorporated communities in Johnson County, Arkansas
1881 establishments in Arkansas
Populated places established in 1881
Unincorporated communities in Arkansas